Tanya Hamilton (born in Spanish Town, Jamaica) is an American film director and producer.  She came to the United States at the age of eight, and settled in Maryland with her mother. She attended Duke Ellington School of the Arts, Cooper Union for the Advancement of Science and Art, and Columbia University.

Hamilton's first project was a short film entitled The Killers, which was released in 1997. This work won awards at the Berlin International Film Festival and New Line Cinema. Her first feature film was Night Catches Us, a portrayal of former Black Panthers reuniting in 1976 Philadelphia. In 2011, Hamilton received an Athena Film Festival award for directing, as well as Black Reel Award nomination for best director for this film. It was also nominated for an Independent Spirit Awards, four Image Awards, a Gotham Awards and the Sundance Film Festival Grand Jury Prize.

Filmography

References

External links

Columbia University School Of The Arts Film
Tanys Hamilton's interview at NY TIMES

American film directors
Screenwriters from Maryland
Jamaican emigrants to the United States
American women film directors
Columbia University alumni
Living people
People educated at Woldingham School
American women screenwriters
Year of birth missing (living people)
People from Spanish Town
American women television directors
American television directors
21st-century American women